Lino Nelisi (born 1952) is a Niuean-born New Zealand author and educator.

Biography 
Nelisi was born in 1952 in Avatele, Niue. Her father Ugamea Levi was from Avatele, and mother, Peko, was Samoan.

Nelisi was the first Pacific Island student to graduate with a master's degree in education (Pasifika Education) from the University of Auckland Epsom Campus.

Nelisi is a Niue language and culture expert. She began taught in Niue between 1970 and 1977, and in Auckland from the late 1980s.

Nelisi has published in several Pacific languages, including in English, Māori, Samoan, Tongan, Niuean, Tokelauan, Cook Island Māori and Spanish.

In 2015, Nelisi was the writer in residence at St Joseph's School, Otahuhu.

Published works 
She has published a number of books for children including:
 Aiani moe Pia aitu (1993)
 Koe ama uga (1994)
 Venise and the little red radio (1996)
 Siones' Tale (1992)
 Te taro O Sione (1992)
 Koe tale ha Sione (1993)
 O le talo Sione (1993)
 Fishing with Spiderwebs (1994)
 Sione Went Fishing (1996)
 Thats the way (1998)
 El taro de Sione (1996)
 Tāne te whetū o te rā (1997)
 Tane steals the show (1997)
 He ika mawhitiwhiti pungawerewere (2000)
 Ko e Pele Kilikiki (2003)
 The Blue Roses (2010)

Awards and honours
In the AIM Children's Book Awards, O le talo Sione (1993) was a finalist in 1993 and Fishing with Spiderwebs was a finalist in 1995. Tāne te whetū o te rā (and its English translation Tane steals the show) was a finalist in the Picture Book category at the 1998 New Zealand Book Awards for Children and Young Adults.

References

Further reading 
 The Oxford Companion to New Zealand Literature (1998) Edited by Roger Robinson and Nelson Wattie, Oxford University Press, 

1952 births
Living people
New Zealand people of Samoan descent
Niuean emigrants to New Zealand
University of Auckland alumni
New Zealand fiction writers
New Zealand women children's writers
20th-century New Zealand women writers
21st-century New Zealand women writers